"Jump On Demand" is a single released by the Tewkesbury ska punk band Spunge on June 3, 2002. The single was released as a 7" vinyl and two CD versions. The first CD contains the music video for "Jump on Demand". It peaked at number 39 on the UK Singles Chart.

Track listings
7" Vinyl
"Jump on Demand"
"All She Ever Wants"

CD 1
"Jump on Demand"
"Go Away"

CD 2
"Jump on Demand" - 3:22
"Whitehouse" - 2:24
"Best Mates Girlfriend" - 3:28

2002 singles
Spunge songs
Ska punk songs